Aplastodiscus cavicola is a species of frog in the family Hylidae.
It is endemic to Brazil.
Its natural habitats are subtropical or tropical moist lowland forests and rivers.
It is threatened by habitat loss.

References

Sources

Aplastodiscus
Endemic fauna of Brazil
Amphibians described in 1984
Taxonomy articles created by Polbot